George Jennings (c.1721 – 9 June 1790) was a British politician.

He was elected as a Member of Parliament (MP) for the borough of Whitchurch in Hampshire at a by-election in March 1757. He was returned for Whitchurch at the 1761 general election, and held the seat until the 1768 general election.

He was elected as an (MP) for the borough of St Germans in Cornwall at a by-election in March 1768, and held the seat until the 1774 general election.  At the 1784 general election he was returned as an MP for Thetford. He held that seat until the 1790 general election.

References 

1720s births
1790 deaths
Members of the Parliament of Great Britain for English constituencies
Members of the Parliament of Great Britain for St Germans
British MPs 1754–1761
British MPs 1761–1768
British MPs 1768–1774
British MPs 1784–1790